Taliya SC is a Syrian professional basketball club, part of Al-Taliya Sports Club and based in Hama, Syria.

League positions
Syrian Basketball League
Fifth place (1): 2016 (Group B) – 2021
Sixth place (2): 2009 – 2014
Seventh place (3): 2005 – 2008 – 2010

References

Basketball in Syria
Sports clubs in Syria
Basketball teams in Syria
Basketball teams established in 1941
1941 establishments in Mandatory Syria